Chattenden is a village within the civil parish of Hoo, which is within the unitary authority of Medway, Kent, England. It was, until 1998, part of Kent and is still ceremonially associated via the Lieutenancies Act. The A228 goes through the village.

Origins
Chattenden means 'Forest Settlement' from the elements ceto and ham dun. It is recorded in 1100 as Chetindunam, and Chatindone in 1281.

Geography and ecology
Turning left on the A228 on the brow of Four Elms Hill, leads onto Kitchener Road, that eventually leads itself to Chattenden Woods and Lodge Hill, designated as an SSSI, due to the diversity of insects, birds, plants and trees found there. To the south of Chattenden is Towerhill Wood, also known as Coxham Wood, with has Public Footpaths that lead into Lower Upnor, where the Arethusa Venture Centre and the Medway Yacht Club (MYC) are located. Along the A228, (which becomes the Ratcliffe Highway in Chattenden), was once a pub known as 'The Old George'.

Military history
In 1875, the War Office built five magazines on a hillside at Chattenden. This facility expanded and a nearby site at Lodge Hill was established in 1899. These sites, which became known as Chattenden and Lodge Hill Military Camps, were put up for sale in 2016.

See also
 Chattenden and Upnor Railway

Notes

References

Sources

External links

Hoo St Werburgh Parish Council

Places in Medway